Escanaba Firing Line is an American rock band formed in Traverse City, Michigan in 2002, by brothers Jesse and Ryan Younce. Shortly after the bands conception they were joined by bassist Chris Davies and drummer Chad Sturdivant.

They take their name after the city of Escanaba, located in Michigan's Upper Peninsula. They have cited the genres of progressive rock, punk rock, jazz fusion, and Nuevo tango as major influences as well as Middle Eastern, Celtic, and African musical styles among some of their main influences.

Members

Current members
Ryan Younce - vocals, Guitar
Jesse Younce - vocals, Guitar
Chad Sturdivant - drums
Chris Davies - Bass guitar

Previous members
Tony Colombo - Bass (2002–2007)
Mike Fuksman - Drums (2004–2007)
Jeremy VanSice - Drums (2002–2004)

Discography

Albums
Big Disco, (2006)

EPs
Speak and Destroy, (2003)

Live albums and compilations
Live at Jacob's Well Traverse City, MI 2003, (2003)
Live at Saint Andrew's Hall Detroit, MI 2003, (2003)
Live at Short's 2005, (2006)
Live at the Belmont 2010, (2010)

Notes and references

External links
escanabafiringline.com  - Official website
Escanaba Firing Line at Myspace
Escanaba Firing Line at Last.fm
Escanaba Firing Line at Pure Volume

2002 establishments in Michigan
American art rock groups
American experimental rock groups
American post-hardcore musical groups
Alternative rock groups from Michigan
Hard rock musical groups from Michigan
Indie rock musical groups from Michigan
Musical quartets
Musical groups established in 2002
Progressive rock musical groups from Michigan